Anurudda Bandara Rajapakse (born 14 July 1985) is a Sri Lankan cricketer. He made his first-class debut for Kurunegala Youth Cricket Club in the 2005–06 Premier League Tournament on 20 January 2006.

References

External links
 

1985 births
Living people
Sri Lankan cricketers
Kurunegala Youth Cricket Club cricketers
Place of birth missing (living people)